20 Aquilae, abbreviated 20 Aql, is an irregular variable  star in the equatorial constellation of Aquila. 20 Aquilae is its Flamsteed designation. It ranges in magnitude from a peak of 5.33 down to 5.36, which is bright enough for the star to be visible to the naked eye. The star is moving closer to the Earth with a heliocentric radial velocity of −23 km/s.

There has been some disagreement over the stellar classification of this star. Buscombe (1962) listed a class of B3 IV, which suggests a B-type subgiant star that has exhausted the hydrogen at its core and is expanding off the main sequence. Lesh (1968) and Braganca et al. (2012) matched a B-type main sequence star with a class of B3 V. However, Houk and Swift (1999) found a class of B2/3 II, indicating this is an evolved bright giant.

The star is about 28 million years old with a high rate of spin, showing a projected rotational velocity of 133 km/s. It has 8.6 times the mass of the Sun and is radiating 7,284 times the Sun's luminosity from its photosphere at an effective temperature of 18,700 K.

References

B-type main-sequence stars
B-type subgiants
B-type bright giants
Irregular variables
Aquila (constellation)
Durchmusterung objects
Aquilae, 20
179406
094385
7279
Suspected variables